Radom Synagogue was an Orthodox Synagogue in Radom, Poland, destroyed by Nazi Germany following the invasion of Poland in World War II. The Synagogue was located at Podwalna Street, previously named the Bożnicza Street. It was built in 1846, and burned to the ground in 1939 when the Radom Ghetto was set up. Almost all Radom Jews perished during the Holocaust in occupied Poland resulting in nearly complete abandonment of the site. After the end of war, the ruins of the Synagogue were dismantled on the orders of the local pro-Soviet communist government.

Aftermath

In 1950, during the following period of Stalinism in Poland, at the empty lot where the Synagogue once stood, the local officials erected a memorial commemorating the lost Jewish community of Radom based on design of  Jakub Zajdensznir, and inscribed as devoted to victims of Nazism.

References

 Sebastian Piątkowski, Radom - zarys dziejów miasta, Radom 2000, .

Former synagogues in Poland
Synagogues in Poland destroyed by Nazi Germany
Orthodox synagogues in Poland